Zirconium(III) bromide is an inorganic compound with the formula ZrBr3.

Preparation
Almost all the trihalides of titanium, zirconium and hafnium can be prepared by the high-temperature reduction of the corresponding tetrahalide with the metal. Incomplete reaction and contamination of the product with excess metal often occurs.

Zirconium(III) bromide can thus be prepared from zirconium(IV) bromide and zirconium foil.

3 ZrBr4 + Zr → 4 ZrBr3

Alternatively, zirconium(III) bromide crystallises from a solution of zirconium(III) in aluminium tribromide. The solution is prepared by reducing a eutectic solution of ZrBr4 in liquid AlBr3 at a temperature of 230–300 °C with metallic zirconium or aluminium.

Structure and bonding
Zirconium(III) bromide has a lower magnetic moment than is expected for the d1 metal ion Zr3+, indicating non-negligible Zr-Zr bonding.

The crystal structure of zirconium(III) bromide is based on hexagonal close packing of bromide ions with one third of the octahedral interstices occupied by Zr3+ ions. The structure consists of parallel chains of face-sharing {ZrBr6} octahedra with equally spaced metal atoms. There is some elongation of the octahedra along the metal-metal axis, partly due to metal-metal repulsion.  ZrCl3, ZrBr3 and ZrI3 all adopt the β-TiCl3 structure, but the elongation of octahedra is most pronounced in the chloride, moderate in the bromide and negligible in the iodide.

References

Zirconium(III) compounds
Bromides
Metal halides